A column family is a database object that contains columns of related data. It is a tuple (pair) that consists of a key–value pair, where the key is mapped to a value that is a set of columns. In analogy with relational databases, a column family is as a "table", each key-value pair being a "row". Each column is a tuple (triplet) consisting of a column name, a value, and a timestamp.  In a relational database table, this data would be grouped together within a table with other non-related data.

Two types of column families exist:
 Standard column family: contains only columns
 Super column family: contains a map of super columns

See also
 Keyspace (NoSQL)

External links
The Apache Cassandra data model
Distributed data stores
NoSQL